Illinois Route 58 (IL 58, Illinois 58), also known as  Golf Road for most of its route, is a state highway in northeast Illinois. It runs from Illinois Route 25 (Liberty Street) in Elgin east to U.S. Route 41 (Skokie Boulevard) in Skokie.

Route description 

It is four-lane road for most of its length, and six lanes through a very high-traffic corridor between Hoffman Estates and Schaumburg.  The only section that is not multilane is from just east of Waverly Drive in Elgin to just west of Barrington Road in Hoffman Estates.

Starting in Elgin, the road is called Summit Street. Just east of Rohrssen Road in Hoffman Estates, the road is named Golf Road, which the route is commonly called locally, after the minuscule town of Golf that the route passes through.

The junction of Illinois 58 and Illinois Route 72 (Higgins Road) in Hoffman Estates form one of the only six-lane by six-lane sharply angled intersections in the state. Left turns used to be prohibited from Golf Road onto Higgins Road because of the sharp angle, but recent road construction has made a separate lane for doing this in both directions.

In Des Plaines, Illinois 58 and U.S. 14 (as the Northwest Highway here) use other minor feeder roads to provide access to each other. The feeder roads are accessible via a two-lane traffic circle north of the overpass—arguably the busiest traffic circle in the Chicago metropolitan area.

 The road continues to run east from Golf towards Skokie, turning south and running concurrent with Illinois Route 43 (Waukegan Road) before displacing U.S. Route 14 at Dempster Street as it turns back east towards U.S. 41.

History 
SBI Route 58 is the same as it was in 1924, with parts of it called the Evanston-Elgin Road. Before 1972, it terminated at Sheridan Road (then part of IL 42). In 1972, it was dropped east of U.S. 41. In 1981, US 20 Business in Elgin was decommissioned. As a result, IL 58 was dropped west of IL 25.

Junction list

References

External links 

058
Transportation in Kane County, Illinois
Transportation in Cook County, Illinois